Moein Al Bastaki (born 29 August 1980) is an Emirati television presenter and magician. Hailing from Dubai, Al Bastaki is best known for his street magic, large illusions, mentalism and performing close up magic for international and Arabic celebrities. He is currently signed with WWE where he hosts WWE Wal3ooha.

Early life 
Moein Al Bastaki was born and raised in Dubai, United Arab Emirates. He is the eldest of four siblings. His love of magic began at a very young age. His grandfather, a trader, would return from trips overseas with magic tricks that he had learned. The first trick that Al Bastaki ever witnessed involved the disappearing and reappearing of a coin, which fascinated Al Bastaki and embedded a passion for the art of magic in a six-year-old child. He first performed aged 9 in a magic show that he prepared for his family. The show was not very successful, and his tricks were not well received, but his uncle paid him 5 UAE dirhams as a reward for his performance.
Al Bastaki’s father, Mohammed Al Bastaki, was the owner of a video rental shop, and as a young child, Al Bastaki became fascinated with the David Copperfield Show (1986). As his love for magic grew, he began studying the work of other internationally renowned magicians, and developing his own Arab inspired magic tricks. Al Bastaki’s biggest inspiration is Derren Brown, who triggered a passion for mentalism.

Education 

Moein Al Bastaki graduated from Al Imam Malik school in 1998. He then attended Dubai University College where he graduated, with a bachelor's degree in Business, in 2004. Having been deprived of an education himself, Al Bastaki’s father disagreed with Al Bastaki’s choice of career, and insisted that his son focus on education instead, so Al Bastaki continued with his studies and obtained a master's degree in marketing from the University of Wollongong in Dubai in 2008.

Magic career 

Al Bastaki began his magic career in 2005 with small performances for friends and relatives. His first professional performance was in 2005 for a New Year's Eve event in Dubai. From 2005 until 2010, Al Bastaki performed close up magic and stage shows at a range of events and festivals across the UAE. He finally began performing on TV and radio, with his first appearance on Sama TV in 2010. Since then, Al Bastaki has performed publicly and appeared on a number of Arabic TV shows, most recently as a weekly guest on Men El Akher, on DMTV.  In 2015 Al Bastaki launched a new line of magic tricks products under his own brand that hit most of UAE and GCC toy shops. In 2016 Al Bastaki took his performances to the next stage using the power of the mind. He undertook a variety of never before seen tricks with a distinct middle eastern flavor.

Celebrity 

Al Bastaki has performed tricks for a number of internationally recognized celebrities including John Travolta and Mike Tyson, WWE stars such as The Miz, John Cena, CM Punk and R-Truth, sports personalities such as Diego Maradona and Fabio Cannavaro. He has also performed for a number of famous Arabic celebrities including Sami Yusuf, Abdulhussain Abdulredha, Hayat El Fahad, Saad Al-Faraj, Ibrahim Al Sallal, Jasim El Nabhan, Ahmed El Sakka, Ahmed Bedair and Dawood Hussain.

TV Appearances 

Al Bastaki has appeared on a number of TV stations including MBC, Al Arabiya, CNN, BBC, Abu Dhabi TV, Dubai One, Dubai Television, Dubai Sports, Rotana, Qatar TV, Orbit TV, DMTV and Future Television, and radio stations including MBC FM, Panorama FM, Saudi Radio and Dubai FM 
He has appeared on the following shows: 
 Pulse 95 ( Sharjah Broadcasting Authority )
 Men El Akher 
 Ya Halla (Rotana) 
 Saba Al Kheir Ya’Arab (MBC) 
 MBC this week 
 Inside the Middle East 
 Al Forsah (Sama Dubai) 
 Studio One (Dubai One) 
 BBC World News
 Spotlight (OSN)

WWE 

In 2017, Moein Al Bastaki became a TV presenter of a new weekly Arabic show WWE Wal3ooha on MBC Action. Titled WWE Wal3ooha, meaning ‘light it up’, the weekly show sees presenters Moein Al Bastaki and Nathalie Mamo delivering exclusive interviews, highlights and stories from the week’s key matches to WWE fans in the region.

Additional sources
Emirati illusionist plans to open magic school in Dubai
Tempo Planet "Magical Moein"
Time Out Dubai "Moein Al Bastaki: UAE's only magician"
Moein Al Bastaki Wows Travolta
FirstPost "Moein Al Bastaki Performing a magic trick with the WWE Superstar John Cena in Dubai & Abu Dhabi " 
Magicaean World Magic News "Dubai based magician Moein Al Bastaki recently posted this encounter with private airline pilot and actor John Travolta."
Khaleej Times "Passion not an illusion"
WWE Wal3ooha will take fans to the heart of the WWE Universe - Presented by Moein Al Bastaki and Nathalie Mamo for the region, from the region
WWE and OSN announce new weekly Arabic show WWE Wal3ooha

External links
Official website

1980 births
Living people
People from Abu Dhabi
Emirati magicians
Mentalists